Bahadurpur is a village in the Sangrur District of the Indian state of Punjab. It is located at 4km from the holy site of Mastuana Sahib, 10km from Sangrur, 32 km from Barnala, on Sangrur-Barnala main road. It has a population of 8,367, according to the 2011 census.

It is part of the Sunam assembly constituency and the Sangrur parliamentary seat. Its neighbouring villages are Duggan, Badrukhan, Bhaini Mehraj, Natt, Kunran, Badbar and Bhammabadi. This is the village of jind riyast Raja sher Singh  whose 4th generation presently live in village .

Demographics 

The majority of the residents are Jatt (Sikh) of Khaira's Gotra. There is also majority of Muslims, Bania (mahajan), Brahmins, saini's, Tarkhaan (Ramgarhia), Nai, Mehra and Dalit. This secular village supports Gurdwara Sahib, Mandirs and mosques.

Economy 

Agriculture is the main occupation of majority population of village . Around 5% peoples are employed in Mastuana Sahib. Many of people in army, teacher  and in other Profession.

Political view 
Population majority supports rural parties i.e akalis and congress but commonly dhindsa family use the village emotions during elections because of their family relatives live in the village.

Climate 

Bahadurpur's climate offers extreme hot and cold conditions. Annual temperature in Bahadurpur ranges from 1 °C to 46 °C (min/max), but can reach 49 °C in summer and 0 °C in winter. The northeast area receives heavy rainfall, while further south and west experiences greater rainfall and higher temperatures. Average annual rainfall ranges around 460 mm.

Bahadurpur has three seasons:
 Summer (February to May)
 Monsoon (June to September), the rainy season
 Winter (October to January), when temperatures typically fall as low as 0 °C

Schools 

 Primary schools
 Akal Senior Secondary School

Banking 

A branch of Oriental Bank of Commerce operates there. A cooperative bank serves Bahadurpur, Duggan and Kunran villages.

Religious Shrines 

 Gurudwara Akal Bunga Sahib
 Baba Mann Dass Mandir
 Jamna Wala Dera
 Sati Mai
Masjid

Villages in Sangrur district